Mira Anna Maria Luoti (born February 28, 1978, in Pori) is a Finnish singer and actress, best known as co-frontwoman of the band PMMP with Paula Vesala. 

Luoti was a guest judge on the singing competition series Idols in 2011. She released her solo albums Tunnelivisio, and Haureuden valtatiel in 2016 and 2019 respectively. 

In 2021, Luoti starred in the second season of the show Myyrä.

References 

1978 births
Living people
21st-century Finnish women singers